The 2009 New Zealand Grand Prix was an open wheel racing car race held at Manfeild Autocourse, near Feilding on 1 March 2009.

It was the fifty-fourth New Zealand Grand Prix and was open to Toyota Racing Series cars (based on international Formula Three regulations). The event was also the third race of the fifth round of the 2008–09 Toyota Racing Series. Daniel Gaunt won his second New Zealand Grand Prix in three years, reclaiming the honours from Andy Knight.

Classification

Qualifying

Race

References

External links
 Toyota Racing Series

New Zealand Grand Prix
Grand Prix
Toyota Racing Series
New Zealand Grand Prix